Sefiddasht Rural District is a rural district (dehestan) in the Central District of Aran va Bidgol County, Isfahan Province, Iran. At the 2006 census, its population was 5,872, in 1,545 families.  The rural district has 21 villages.

References 

Rural Districts of Isfahan Province
Aran va Bidgol County